Heritage is a 1984 Yugoslavian drama film directed by Matjaž Klopčič. It was screened in the Un Certain Regard section at the 1985 Cannes Film Festival.

Cast
 Ivo Ban - Viktor
 Polde Bibič
 Bine Matoh
 Bernarda Oman
 Boris Ostan
 Radko Polič
 Majda Potokar - Mila
 Milena Zupančič

References

External links

1984 films
1984 drama films
Films directed by Matjaž Klopčič
Slovene-language films
Slovenian drama films
Yugoslav drama films
Films set in Yugoslavia